Giovanni Bonifacio Panella (died 1417) was a Roman Catholic prelate who served as Archbishop (Personal Title) of Muro Lucano (1407–1417), 
Archbishop (Personal Title) of Capaccio (1399–1407), 
Archbishop of Durrës (1395–1399), and 
Bishop of Ferentino (1392–1395).

Biography
On 8 March 1392, Giovanni Bonifacio Panella was appointed during the papacy of Pope Boniface IX as Bishop of Ferentino.
On 23 April 1392, he was consecrated bishop by Pope Boniface IX. 
On 15 May 1395, he was appointed during the papacy of Pope Boniface IX as Archbishop of Durrës.
On 16 May 1399, he was appointed during the papacy of Pope Boniface IX as Archbishop (Personal Title) of Capaccio.
On 23 February 1407, he was appointed during the papacy of Pope Gregory XII as Archbishop (Personal Title) of Muro Lucano.
He served as Bishop of Muro Lucano until his death in 1417.

References

External links and additional sources
 (for Chronology of Bishops) 
 (for Chronology of Bishops) 
 (for Chronology of Bishops) 
 (for Chronology of Bishops) 
 (for Chronology of Bishops) 
 (for Chronology of Bishops) 
 (for Chronology of Bishops) 
 (for Chronology of Bishops) 

14th-century Roman Catholic archbishops in Serbia
15th-century Italian Roman Catholic bishops
Bishops appointed by Pope Boniface IX
Bishops appointed by Pope Gregory XII
1417 deaths